Johanna Catharina Cornelius (February 27, 1912 – June 21, 1974) was an Afrikaner activist and trade unionist. She served as the Afrikaner Garment Workers' Union of South Africa (GWU) president after Solly Sachs.

Biography 
Cornelius was born in Lichtenburg, South Africa, and grew up in rural South Africa as one of nine children. Her father and grandfather both fought in the Anglo Boer War and her mother was held in a concentration camp during the war. She and her older sister, Hester Cornelius, moved to Johannesburg in the 1920s, where Johanna eventually started working in a garment factory. Cornelius worked as a machinist in the factory.

Cornelius was arrested and detained in jail for several house in 1932 while participating in a GWU strike. After she was released from jail, she spoke to the workers and encouraged them to "demand a living wage and freedom." Her speech also referenced the Great Trek and the Anglo Boer War, joining "nationalism together with the class struggle rather than with the national struggle." She went to the Soviet Union as part of a workers' delegation in 1933. Her trip there helped her learn more about communism and a sense of social equality. When she returned from the Soviet Union, she became a full-time union organizer for GWU, working from the main office in Germiston.

Cornelius worked as the GWU president from 1935 to 1937 and under her leadership, the union won reduced working hours and increased wages for workers. Cornelius worked to include people of all backgrounds in the union and felt that working in the union had helped her "transcend the racial attitudes" of her past. She and Hester also traveled to Cape Town in February 1936 help the GWU branch there.

Cornelius was accused in 1938 of being a "communist accomplice of Sachs and for spending all her time organising black people." However, she was able to successfully fight off attempts by Afrikaner nationalists who wanted to take control of the union. She became a founder of the National Union of Cigarette and Tobacco Workers in 1938, later leading a two-week strike in Rustenburg in September 1940. The strike in Rustenberg was "heated" and women in the strike faced tear gas and police attacks.

In 1943 she ran unsuccessfully as an Independent Labor Party candidate. When Solly Sachs was exiled from South Africa in 1952, she took over the GWU and worked that position until her death.

Cornelius died on June 21, 1974, in Johannesburg.

References

Citations

Sources 
 

1912 births
1974 deaths
People from Lichtenburg
Afrikaner people
South African trade union leaders
South African women activists
Afrikaans-speaking people
Women trade unionists